Rapu-Rapu, officially the Municipality of Rapu-Rapu, is a 3rd class municipality in the province of Albay in the Bicol Region of the Philippines. The population was 36,151 at the 2020 census.

The municipality comprises three islands: Rapu-rapu Island, Batan Island, and Guinanayan Island.

History
Rapu-Rapu and Batan Islands were historically part of Prieto Diaz in Sorsogon. Before it became a municipality on 1901, it was a bario of Prieto Diaz, Sorsogon. The Visita (Chapel) here and the spiritual and pastoral needs of the people were taken care of by the Parish Priest of Prieto Diaz. Records show that Rev. Fr. Santiago Nepomuceno was in charge here in the early part of 1891, then Rev. Fr. Juan Brusola took over. It was during his term that the Parish of Sta. Florentina was founded.

Sometime after the year 1891,Rapu - Rapu and Batan Islands became part of the municipality of Bacon, Sorsogon mainly due to their geographical location, nearer to Bacon than to Prieto Diaz. This move was more favorable to the people transportation - wise and business - wise. Because of the growing population in both islands, Governor Arlington Betts, Civil Governor for the Province of Albay, created the municipality of Rapu - Rapu in 1901. A plebiscite was held. The people were made to choose, if they would want to belong to the province of Sorsogon or to the province of Albay. Majority of the people chose Albay for their province and their will pass respected.

Geography

According to the Philippine Statistics Authority, the municipality has a land area of  constituting  of the  total area of Albay.

The small island of Rapu-Rapu and Batan lie to the east of Luzon and together with the islands of San Miguel and Cagraray, form the northern rim of Albay Gulf. These islands represents a low monoclinal continuation of the eastern structural arch into the waters of Lagonoy Gulf. Most of the land surface of Rapu-Rapu has exposed basement-complex rocks in its interior consisting mainly of serpentines. Rapu-Rapu have deposits of coal and copper.

Barangays
Rapu-Rapu is politically subdivided into 34 barangays.

Climate

Rapu-Rapu has a tropical climate. There is significant rainfall throughout the year in Rapu-Rapu. Even the driest month still has a lot of rainfall. According to Köppen and Geiger, the climate is classified as Af. It is the lowest average temperature of the whole year. The difference in precipitation between the driest month and the wettest month is 344 mm. The average temperatures vary during the year by 2.6 °C.

Typhoons are an especially frequent and destructive menace in the Bicol region. The months of September, October and November experience the more destructive of these violent tropical storms. Forty percent of the storms carrying high-velocity winds in the Philippine pass through Southeastern Luzon where Rapu-Rapu is located.

Demographics

In the 2020 census, Rapu-Rapu had a population of 36,151.

Government
The following were the elected officials of Rapu-Rapu for the term 2013–2016.

Education
Rapu-Rapu has 36 elementary schools and 7 secondary schools directly supervised by Department of Education-Division of Albay.

Primary schools

 Acal Elementary School
 Bagaobawan Elementary School
 Batan Elementary School
 Bilbao Elementary School
 Binosawan Elementary School
 Bogtong Elementary School
 Buenavista Elementary School
 Buhatan Elementary School
 Calanaga Elementary School
 Caracaran Elementary School
 Carogcog Elementary School
 Dapdap Elementary School
 Gaba Elementary School
 Galicia Elementary School
 Guinanayan Elementary School
 Hamorawon Elementary School
 Lagundi Elementary School
 Liguan Elementary School
 Linao Elementary School
 Malobago Elementary School
 Mananao Elementary School
 Mancao Elementary School
 Manila Elementary School
 Masaga Elementary School
 Minso Elementary School
 Morocborocan Elementary School
 Nagcalsot Elementary School
 Nstr. Sra De Guadalupe Elementary School
 Pagcolbon Elementary School
 Rapu-Rapu Elementary School
 Sagrada Elementary School
 San Ramon Elementary School
 Tinocawan Elementary School
 Tinopan Elementary School
 Viga Elementary School
 Villahermosa Elementary School

Secondary schools

 Batan National High School
 Bilbao National High School
 Bogtong National High School
 Mancao National High School
 Rapu-Rapu National High School
 Tinopan National High School
 Villahermosa National High School

References

External links
 [ Philippine Standard Geographic Code]

Municipalities of Albay
Island municipalities in the Philippines